The Bürgermeisterei Weyerbusch ("Mayoralty of Weyerbusch") was one of the nine Prussian Bürgermeistereien or mayoralties, into which the county of Altenkirchen, created in 1816 as part of the Regierungsbezirk Coblenz was administratively divided. The mayoralty had 25 municipalities with a population of 2,564 in 1817. From 1845 to 1848, Friedrich Wilhelm Raiffeisen was the mayor. The mayoralty was renamed in 1927 to Amt Weyerbusch.

Municipalities 
According to statistics in 1843 and 1861 the following municipalities belonged to the Bürgermeisterei (today's spelling is used; the division is based on the old territorial allocation):
 Originally part of the ecclesial parish of Mehren in the County of Sayn-Altenkirchen
 Ersfeld
 Fiersbach including the farms of Dickten and Kriegershof
 Forstmehren
 Giershausen
 Hirzbach with its hamlet of Hähnen
 Kircheib including the hamlets of Reisbitzen, Eckenbach and Grünewald and the farm of Bleckhausen
 Kraam with the hamlet of Heuberg and a mill
 Maulsbach
 Mehren, Kirchdorf with the hamlets of Adorf and Seifen, the farm of Acker and the Hard Mill
 Neuenhof and the farms of Tente, Röttgen and Burg (today villages in Kircheib)
 Rettersen with its hamlets of Hahn and Witthecke, the farm of Roßberg and the Willachshaus
 Ziegenhain

 Originally part of the ecclesial parish of Birnbach in the County of Sayn-Hachenburg
 Birnbach, Kirchdorf
 Hasselbach with a mill
 Hemmelzen with a mill
 Hilkhausen with the hamlets of Irlen and Wiesplacken (today villages in Weyerbusch)
 Marenbach (today a village in Oberirsen)
 Neitersen with the hamlet of Fladersbach
 Niederölfen (today a village in Neitersen)
 Oberirsen
 Oberölfen (today a village in Helmenzen)
 Rimbach mit einer Mühle (today a village in Oberirsen)
 Weyerbusch
 Wölmersen
 Werkhausen with the hamlet of Leingen and the farms of Ochsenbruch and Acker

Bürgermeisters 
The Bürgermeisters, from 1927, Amtsbürgermeisters, of Weyerbusch were:

References 

Altenkirchen (district)
History of the Westerwald
Weyerbusch